Wasunde, is the only village in the Vasunde gram panchayat  in the Parner Taluka of the Ahmednagar District, state of Maharashtra, India.

Education

Schools
 Jilha Parishad Prathamik School
 Bhausaheb Shishan Prasarak Mandal's New English School, Wasunde

Religion
The majority of the population in Wasunde is Hindu

Areas
BarveNagar
Wable Wasti
Boknakwadi
Wable Wasti
Kharabhi Wasti
Shinde Wasti
Shikri

Banking and finance
 Kanhur Pathar Patsantha
 Gurudatta Multistate Co-operative Soc Ltd. Wasunde
 Vasantdada Sahakari Patsanstha.

Temples
 Power God Hanuman Mandir
 Mahdev Mandir
 Bhausaheb Maharaj Temple
 Jogeshwari Temple
 Biroba Mandir

See also
 Takali Dhokeshwar
 Karjule Hareshwar
 Kasare
 Parner
 Ahmednagar

References 

Villages in Parner taluka
Villages in Ahmednagar district
Ahmednagar district